The Regulation of Railways Act 1889 (52 & 53 Vict c 57) is an Act of the Parliament of the United Kingdom. It is one of the Railway Regulation Acts 1840 to 1893. It was enacted following the Armagh rail disaster.

Safety
It empowered the Board of Trade to require any railway company to:

 adopt the block system of signalling on any passenger railway;
 provide for the interlocking of points and signals on such railways;
 provide for and use on all passenger trains continuous brakes; the brakes must be instantaneous in action; self applying in the event of any failure in continuity; capable of being applied to every vehicle of the train; and in regular use in daily working.

Provision was made to enable the railway companies to issue debentures to pay for the capital cost of the equipment.

There were also provisions regarding reporting the number of persons in safety-related employment who worked more than a specified number of hours.

Tickets
The Act also requires passengers to show tickets and to pay a penalty if travelling without a ticket. It also gives powers to agents of the railway to request a name and address and to make it an offence not to provide these details when requested. Prosecutions are still brought under the Act today.

References

Railway Acts
United Kingdom Acts of Parliament 1889
1889 in rail transport